The 10th Toronto International Film Festival (TIFF) took place in Toronto, Ontario, Canada between September 5 and September 14, 1985. The festival featured 460 feature films, the highest number of films in festival.

My American Cousin by Sandy Wilson was selected as the opening film.

Awards

Programme

Gala Presentation
When Father Was Away on Business by Emir Kusturica
My Beautiful Laundrette by Stephen Frears
The Official Story by Luis Puenzo
Desert Hearts by Donna Deitch
The Funeral by Juzo Itami
Singleton's Pluck by Richard Eyre
Lieber Karl by Maria Knilli
Chain Letters by Mark Rappaport
Seduction: The Cruel Woman by Elfi Mikesch and Monika Treut
Colonel Redl by István Szabó
Gebroken spiegels by Marleen Gorris
A Strange Love Affair by Eric de Kuyper & Paul Verstaten
Oriana by Fina Torres
Death of a Salesman by Volker Schlöndorff

Canadian Perspective
90 Days by Giles Walker
The Alley Cat (Le Matou) by Jean Beaudin
Artie Shaw: Time Is All You've Got by Brigitte Berman
Canada's Sweetheart: The Saga of Hal C. Banks by Donald Brittain
Crime Wave by John Paizs
The Lady in Colours (La Dame en couleurs) by Claude Jutra
Eastern Avenue by Peter Mettler
Jacques and November (Jacques et novembre) by Jean Beaudry and François Bouvier
The Last Glacier (Le Dernier glacier) by Jacques Leduc and Roger Frappier
My American Cousin by Sandy Wilson
No Sad Songs by Nik Sheehan
On Land Over Water (Six Stories) by Richard Kerr
Pale Face (Visage pâle) by Claude Gagnon
Samuel Lount by Laurence Keane
Transylvania 1917 by Peter Dudar
A Trilogy by Barbara Sternberg

References

External links
 Official site
 TIFF: A Reel History: 1976 - 2012
1985 Toronto International Film Festival at IMDb

1985
1985 film festivals
1985 in Toronto
1985 in Canadian cinema